The 2016 Middle East Rally Championship was an international rally championship sanctioned by the FIA. The championship was contested over five events held in five Middle East countries from February to October. The championship was reduced to seven rallies for 2016 season, but the end of season rallies, Oman International Rally and Dubai International Rally were cancelled.

Qatar's Nasser Al-Attiyah won his twelfth MERC championship and his sixth consecutively. Al-Attiyah won the first three rallies of the season creating an uncatchable buffer once Oman and Dubai were cancelled. Lebanese driver Rodolphe Asmar was second in the championship, securing the runner's up position with victory in Cyprus. Khalid Mohammad Al-Suwaidi was third.

Event calendar and results

The 2016 MERC was as follows:

Championship standings
The 2016 MERC for Drivers points was as follows:

References

External links

Middle East Rally Championship
Middle East
Middle East Rally Championship